Vesna Goes Fast is a 1996 Italian drama film directed by Carlo Mazzacurati. It entered the competition at the 53rd Venice International Film Festival, in which Tereza Zajickova won a Pasinetti Award for Best Actress. The film also won the Ciak d'Oro for best sound.

Plot

Cast 
 Tereza Zajickova: Vesna
 Antonio Albanese: Antonio
 Silvio Orlando: The insurer
 Ivano Marescotti: The client
 Antonio Catania: The owner of the diner
 Roberto Citran: The waiter
 Stefano Accorsi
 Andrea Karnasová
 Marco Messeri

See also
Movies about immigration to Italy

References

External links

1996 films
1996 drama films
Italian drama films
Films directed by Carlo Mazzacurati
Films about immigration to Italy
1990s Italian-language films
1990s Italian films